Jan Apell and Jonas Björkman successfully defended their title by defeating Jon Ireland and Andrew Kratzmann 6–3, 6–0 in the final.

Seeds

Draw

Draw

References

External links
 Official results archive (ATP)
 Official results archive (ITF)

Men's Doubles
Doubles